Georgios Manalis (born 21 December 1994) is a Greek professional footballer who plays as a forward for Super League 2 club Chania.

References

1994 births
Living people
Super League Greece 2 players
Gamma Ethniki players
Ethnikos Piraeus F.C. players
Ionikos F.C. players
Association football forwards
Footballers from Athens
Greek footballers